The International cricket in 2008  is defined as the season of international cricket between April and August 2008 in all cricket playing countries, as well as all international matches scheduled for the 2008 English Cricket Season. Matches between January and April are defined as belonging to the 2007–08 season, while matches between September and December will fall under the 2008–09 season.

Season overview

Pre-season rankings

April

Bangladesh in Pakistan

May

New Zealand in England

Australia in West Indies

World Cricket League Division 5

The 2008 ICC World Cricket League Division Five took place in May 2008 in Jersey. 12 teams took part in the tournament, including Afghanistan, Bahamas, Botswana, Germany, Japan, Jersey, Mozambique, Nepal, Norway, Singapore, USA, Vanuatu.

Group stage

*The ICC Event Technical Committee, as per 12.1.6 of the ICC World Cricket League Division 5 Playing Conditions, decided  not to replay all of group B's abandoned games. The abandoned match between Japan and Singapore will be played on 29 May to ensure that all teams in Group ` are to be played on 29 May.

Playoffs

Final Placings

June

2008 Kitply Cup

Asia Cup

The 2008 Asia Cup took place in June 2008 in Pakistan. Six teams took part in the tournament, including Bangladesh, India, Hong Kong, Pakistan, Sri Lanka and UAE.

Group stage

Super Fours

Final

Bermuda in Canada

July

Associates Tri-Series in Scotland

South Africa in England

India in Sri Lanka

August

ICC World Twenty20 Qualifier

Group stage

Knockout stage

Bermuda in the Netherlands

Kenya in Scotland

Canada in Ireland

Kenya in the Netherlands

England in Scotland

Associates Tri-Series in Canada

Kenya in Ireland

New Zealand in Pakistan

The New Zealand national cricket team was due to tour Pakistan during the northern summer of 2008. They would have played three One Day Internationals against Pakistan. The tour was cancelled due to the political situation in the country.

Bangladesh in Australia

References

External links
 2008 season on ESPN CricInfo

 
2008 in cricket